The Cuccio is a  torrent of the Province of Como in north Italy.

It rises at Pizzo di Gino (commune of San Nazzaro Val Cavargna) and runs south through the Val Cavargna before entering Lake Lugano at Porlezza.

Rivers of Lombardy
Rivers of the Province of Como
Rivers of Italy